Edgaras Tumasonis (born 8 May 1968 in Alytus) is a retired Lithuanian football defender, who last played for FK Sirijus Klaipėda during his professional career. He obtained a total number of six caps for the Lithuania national football team, scoring no goals.

Honours
National Team
 Baltic Cup
 1992
he was the captain of the team.
FC series.

References

1968 births
Living people
Lithuanian footballers
Lithuania international footballers
Association football defenders
FK Sirijus Klaipėda players
Sportspeople from Alytus